Bughda Kandi Rural District is in the Central District of Zanjan County, Zanjan province, Iran. At the National Census of 2006, its population was 8,586 in 2,031 households. There were 8,442 inhabitants in 2,356 households at the following census of 2011. At the most recent census of 2016, the population of the rural district was 7,133 in 2,227 households. The largest of its 14 villages was Aq Kand, with 1,646 people.

References 

Zanjan County

Rural Districts of Zanjan Province

Populated places in Zanjan Province

Populated places in Zanjan County